The University of Exeter Business School is one of the leading business schools in Europe, and is ranked as being among the best business schools in the world. Founded by the University of Exeter in 2008, the University of Exeter Business School spans two vibrant campuses covering the South West, UK: Streatham Campus within the city of Exeter in Devon and Penryn Campus near the town of Falmouth in Cornwall.

The Business School offers undergraduate BSc and postgraduate degrees in business, economics, marketing, finance, accounting and management programmes. The school is also home to The Exeter MBA which focuses on sustainability, a dedicated Master in Management programme and specialised MSc degrees, as well as MRes and PhD research programmes. The school is in the elite group of business schools worldwide that possess the distinguished Triple Crown Accreditation from AACSB, AMBA and EQUIS.

The University of Exeter Business School has an international student body made up of 112 different nationalities, with 60 partner institutions in 25 countries worldwide  and 27,201 alumni, over half of whom are based internationally across 160 countries.

History

Research
The University of Exeter Business School's research is recognised as world-leading and internationally excellent (REF, 2014), and recent years have seen the School benefit from investment into attracting and recruiting leading international researchers, research teams and distinguished professors. With the launch of research centres in the circular economy, environmental economics, entrepreneurship, and the digital economy the Business School now has 11 research centres that provide a focus for research collaboration within the School, across the University of Exeter and externally:

 Centre for Entrepreneurship
 Centre for Excellence in Teaching and Learning
 Centre for Simulation, Analytics and Modelling (CSAM)
 Exeter Centre for Social networks (ECSN)
 Exeter Centre for Circular Economy (ECCE)
 Exeter Centre for Leadership (ExCL)
 Initiative in Digital Economy (INDEX)
 Exeter Centre for Sustainable Finance (ESF)
 Land, Environment, Economics and Policy Institute (LEEP)
 Tax Administration Research Centre (TARC)
 Research Methods Centre (RMC)

The newly launched Research Methods Centre provides a forum for training PhD students, early career researchers and experienced academics alike to help foster a community of learning and enable faculty to publish in leading academic journals, generate income and deliver impactful research. In recent years the School's research has impacted on many global and national institutions including the International Monetary Fund, the World Bank and the European Commission as well as HMRC, DEFRA and the Met Office.

We are using our insight and expertise to redefine the role of business globally and to teach our students how to use sustainable and responsible business principles to become successful leaders. Our research expertise focus on three important themes, all of which are helping address climate change and other global issues such as biodiversity loss, rising poverty and social inequalities: Environmental Sustainability, Technological Transformation and Responsible Leadership.

You can find out more on our Thought Leadership platform, Exeter Expertise, where our academic research and insights are distilled to help readers tackle the world's greatest challenges.

Reputation
The University of Exeter Business School is part of an elite group of business schools worldwide that possess the distinguished "triple-crown" accreditation from the AACSB (Association to Advance Collegiate Schools of Business), AMBA (Association of MBAs) and EQUIS (European Quality Improvement System).

The School is a UK-based international Business School which is part of the University of Exeter, a Russell Group university amongst the top 150 universities worldwide according to the Times Higher Education World University Rankings 2022 and QS World University Rankings 2022, two of the most influential global league tables. The Times and the Sunday Times Good University Guide 2023 ranks Exeter in 13th position in the UK. The Guardian University Guide 2023 lists Exeter in 15th place in the UK.

Exeter is ranked 14th in the UK of universities targeted by the largest number of top employers in 2021-2022, according to the Graduate Market in 2022 Research Report.

The University of Exeter has four times been awarded a prestigious Queen's Anniversary Prize. The most recent award in 2020 was made to a team of scientists for the pivotal role they have played to expose the devastating effect that plastics pollution has on the health of humans and wildlife.

Partnerships

The business school maintains international partnerships with other leading business schools in Europe and globally. As well as students visiting the school, Exeter students are able to visit schools within the network for a full academic year. The Business School's 60 partner institutions include:

BI Norwegian Business School — Oslo, 
Bocconi University — Milan, 
LUISS Business School — Rome, 
Copenhagen Business School — Copenhagen, 
EDHEC — Nice, 
The University of Hong Kong — Hong Kong, 
Hong Kong University of Science & Technology — Hong Kong, 
Fudan University — China, 
University of Munich — Munich, 
Mannheim Business School — Mannheim, 
WHU – Otto Beisheim School of Management — Vallendar, 
University of Amsterdam — Amsterdam, 
HEC Lausanne (University of Lausanne) — Lausanne, 
Lund School of Economics and Management — Lund,

Notable alumni 
 Abdullah Gül – former President of Turkey (2007–2014)
 Major General Matthew Holmes – Commandant General Royal Marines
 Sajid Javid MP – former Home Secretary and Chancellor of the Exchequer
 Col Mark Lancaster (MBA) – Minister of State for the Armed Forces
 Bob Quick QPM (MBA) – Former Assistant Commissioner
 Sam Skinner (rugby union) – Exeter Chiefs and Scotland rugby player
 Jack Maunder – Exeter Chiefs rugby player
 Henry Staunton – Media mogul

References

External links
University of Exeter Business School
Exeter Expertise
The Exeter MBA
University of Exeter Business School Twitter
University of Exeter Business School LinkedIn
University of Exeter Business School Facebook
University of Exeter Business School Instagram

Business School
Exeter
Educational institutions established in 1998
1998 establishments in England